"The One That Got Away" is a song written by Nathan Winkler, Natasha Bedingfield, Steve Kipner, Andrew Frampton and Michael Tafaro for Bedingfield's 2005 North American debut album Unwritten. The song was backed by remixes by Wamdue and Valentin, was released as a promotional single in the United States in May 2006. The song was released in the United Kingdom as a B-side to "These Words" (2004).

In the United States, the track topped the Billboard Hot Dance Club Play chart and reached number four on the Hot Dance Airplay chart.

Formats and track listings
These are the formats and track listings of major single releases of "The One That Got Away".

CD Single One
 "The One That Got Away" (Valentin Radio Mix) – 3:46
 "The One That Got Away" (Valentin Club Mix) – 6:40
 "The One That Got Away" (Valentin MixShow Mix) – 6:05

CD Single Two
 "The One That Got Away" (Wamdue Pop Mix) – 4:55
 "The One That Got Away" (Wamdue Get Together Extended Vocal Mix) – 9:38
 "The One That Got Away" (Wamdue Get Together Dub) – 6:40
 "The One That Got Away" (Wamdue Get Together Radio Mix) – 5:22

Vinyl Single
 "The One That Got Away" (Wamdue Pop Rocks Mix) – 4:55
 "The One That Got Away" (Wamdue Get Together Dub) – 6:40
 "The One That Got Away" (Wamdue Get Together Extended Vocal Mix) – 9:38

Charts

Weekly charts

* Wamdue & Valentin mix

Year-end charts

Personnel
The following people contributed to "The One That Got Away":
Natasha Bedingfield – lead and backing vocals
Wayne Wilkins – audio engineering
Peter Wade Keusch, John Hill – Producer, mixing
Rob Kinelski – mixing assistant
Herb Powers, James Cruz- mastering

References

External links
 natashabedingfield.com — official website

Natasha Bedingfield songs
Songs written by Steve Kipner
Songs written by Natasha Bedingfield
Songs written by Andrew Frampton (songwriter)
Phonogenic Records singles